The Wabash Trace Nature Trail is a  rail trail located in Iowa which stretches from the city of Council Bluffs southeast to the city of Blanchard.

History 
This rail trail was part of the Wabash Railroad's Omaha to St. Louis rail line. It passes through the towns of Mineola, Silver City, Malvern, Imogene, Shenandoah, Coin and Blanchard. For most of the trail's course, a thin line of trees and bushes parallels the trail. It follows streams such as Silver Creek, Four Mile Creek, Tarkio Creek, and the Tarkio River. The grade is a very gentle one, which is downhill as one pedals northwestward to Council Bluffs.  From Silver City northward, one can coast most of the way.

Highlights

Two miles south of the Council Bluffs trailhead, the Wabash Trace crosses Pony Creek on a long, curving bridge. At the crossing of the West Nishnabotna River there are ruined boxcars lying in the river bed, some of them with wooden sides—remnants of a derailment that occurred in the 1960s. Heading south out of Shenandoah (the largest intermediate town) the path follows the rocky ravine of Four Mile Creek.  The trail ends at Blanchard, close by a tiny service station that straddles the state line.

There are no bicycle repair shops along the way, but there is a nice shop in Silver City which sells basic repair spare parts and provisions, and allows for self repairs.  Shenandoah does have a discount store that sells new bicycles.  The town also has a motel, B & B's and eateries, such as The Depot restaurant and brew-pub, open daily at 6 am. Coin and Mineola have very small trail side parks. Shenandoah has a somewhat larger one, Waubonsie Park. There are portable toilets located in Council Bluffs and Mineola and Silver City. The park in Coin has a shower and electricity and allows tent camping for a small fee. There are parks in Malvern and Shenandoah with free camping.

The small Irish Catholic town of Imogene has a quaint restaurant/bar, The Emerald Isle, as well as a magnificent Catholic Church, St. Patrick's. There is also a developed campsite with showers and restrooms available for a fee.

The nearest repair shop from the trail head in Council Bluffs is Xtreme Wheels Bike and Sport located at 33 S Main St, Council Bluffs, near Broadway in the downtown area, about 4 miles away. It is reached along a northern extension of bike path, then along Harry Langdon Boulevard, for most of the distance. They can repair bikes, sell bikes, and sell equipment as well. Otherwise, two discount stores selling basic bike parts and accessories are located in the Metro Crossing shopping center about 2.5 miles away. At the head of the trace in Council Bluffs, there is also a nice park and eatery for a family to enjoy.

References

External links 
Official Wabash Trace Nature Trail website
Trails from Rails
Trail Link
 Fall Wabash Trace Video

Protected areas of Fremont County, Iowa
Protected areas of Mills County, Iowa
Protected areas of Page County, Iowa
Protected areas of Pottawattamie County, Iowa
Rail trails in Iowa
National Recreation Trails in Iowa